Paul Patrick Streeten (18 July 1917 – 6 January 2019) was an Austrian-born British economics professor. He was a professor at Boston University, US until his retirement. He has been a distinguished academic working on development economics since the 1950s.

Biography

Born in Austria, Streeten spent his formative years in Vienna. He became involved in political activism at an early age, and from 1933 on he was under continual threat of arrest and imprisonment. The 1938 Anschluss forced his family to flee Austria, scattering around the globe. Paul was taken in by a kindly English family, but in 1940 he was interned as an enemy alien. He was placed in several different camps, and in each one he occupied himself by setting up lecture or literary study groups. In 1942 he was able to join the UK military in a commando group destined to fight for the liberation of Sicily. While awaiting the commando action he again set up a drama group. When the action did take place (1943), Streeten was landed behind enemy lines. After a few weeks of heavy fighting, he was severely wounded.

Education and early career
Streeten became a naturalized UK citizen. He entered Balliol College, Oxford in 1944. After receiving a degree he obtained a teaching post there (1948) and remained until 1964.

Career
Streeten's institutional affiliations include the Institute of Development Studies (IDS) unit at the University of Sussex (Streeten was one founder of that unit). He was associated with the UNDP group that creates the annual Human Development Report

He served as founding editor of the journal World Development from 1972. In the 1960s, he worked at the new Ministry of Overseas Development in the United Kingdom and acted as the director of the Institute of Development Studies (IDS). He became Warden of Queen Elizabeth House at the University of Oxford. Starting in 1990 he has been involved with both into the UNDP's Human Development Report and UNESCO's World Culture Reports.

In the 1980s Streeten became a professor at Boston University, and while there also served as director of the World Institute for Development Economics Research.

In the 1960s he was deputy director general of the Economic Planning Staff of the Ministry of Overseas Development and acting director of the Institute of Development Studies at Sussex before becoming Warden of Queen Elizabeth House, Oxford. In 1976-1980 and 1984–1985, he was a senior adviser with the World Bank, helping to formulate policies on basic needs. Since 1990, he has provided intellectual inputs into the UNDP's Human Development Report and UNESCO's World Culture Reports.

He turned 100 in July 2017 and died on 6 January 2019 at the age of 101.

Major published works
Works of Paul Streeten include:

Books

Chapters in books 
 
Also available as:

Journal articles

Book in honour of Paul Streeten

Other 
 United Nations Intellectual History Project (UNIHP), List of interviewees: Paul Streeten.
 Author: Paul P. Streeten Copenhagen Business School Press, Denmark.

References

1917 births
2019 deaths
Academic journal editors
Academics of the University of Oxford
Austrian centenarians
Boston University faculty
British centenarians
British development economists
Men centenarians
Austrian emigrants to the United Kingdom
British expatriates in the United States